Assarw is a city in the Damietta Governorate, Egypt. Its population was estimated at about 27,700 people in 2018.

The old name of the city is Bejaja.

References 

Populated places in Damietta Governorate